David Allday (born 27 November 1964) is a former Australian rules footballer who played with Melbourne and Footscray in the Victorian Football League (VFL) during the 1980s.

Allday, a ruckman from Bentleigh-McKinnon, made four appearances for Melbourne in 1985. He then played 11 games in 1986 and polled Brownlow Medal votes in three of them, including best on ground honours against Fitzroy at Waverley.

He spent the 1988 VFL season at Footscray, where he was a second ruckman to Richard Cousins but he was only required for six games.

The ruckman was an important member of the Werribee team of the early 1990s which won the 1991 minor premiership and the 1993 premiership. He won a club "Best and Fairest" award in 1990 and won a Norm Goss Memorial Medal for his efforts in the 1993 grand final winning side.

References

External links
 DemonWiki profile

1964 births
Australian rules footballers from Victoria (Australia)
Melbourne Football Club players
Western Bulldogs players
Werribee Football Club players
Living people